Comox—Atlin was a federal electoral district in the province of British Columbia, Canada, that was represented in the House of Commons of Canada from 1904 to 1917.

This riding was created in 1903 from parts of Burrard and Vancouver ridings.  The electoral district was abolished in 1914 when it was redistributed into Comox—Alberni and Skeena ridings.

Members of Parliament

Election results

See also 

 List of Canadian federal electoral districts
 Past Canadian electoral districts

External links
Riding history from the Library of Parliament

Defunct British Columbia federal electoral districts on Vancouver Island